Fort Brown (originally Fort Texas) was a military post of the United States Army in Cameron County, Texas, during the latter half of the 19th century and the early part of the 20th century.  Established in 1846, it was the first US Army military outpost of the recently annexed state.  Confederate Army troops stationed there saw action during the American Civil War. In the early 20th century, it was garrisoned in relation to military activity over border conflicts with Mexico.  Surviving elements of the fort were designated as a National Historic Landmark in 1960.

Early years
In 1846, Captain Joseph K. Mansfield directed the construction of a star-shaped earthwork for 800 men called "Fort Texas" on the northern side of the Rio Grande, "by the order from General [Zachary] Taylor to command the city of Matamoros" south of the river.

The next year, the fort was besieged during the opening of the Mexican–American War. During the Siege of Fort Texas, two Americans were killed, including Major Jacob Brown and George Oakes Stevens (of Vermont) of the 2nd Dragoons. In honor of the fallen major, General Taylor renamed the post as Fort Brown. In 1849, the city of Brownsville, Texas, was established not far from the fort's grounds, after the United States had acquired Texas following the war.

Cortina
While in command at the fort, Major Samuel P. Heintzelman coordinated with John Salmon Ford in the Cortina Troubles, culminating in the Battle of Rio Grande City in 1859.

Civil War
In 1861, Confederate Col. John "Rip" Ford occupied the fort, with a garrison there until 1863. The Confederate forces were finally driven out by Union forces under General Nathaniel P. Banks, who had his troops camped in tents erected at the fort site. This Union occupation ended in 1864, when Confederate forces under General James E. Slaughter and Colonel Ford took control of the area. They held the post until the end of the war, when it was occupied again by Union forces under General Egbert Brown.

Postbellum
From 1867–1869, a permanent US Army fort was constructed under the supervision of Capt. William A. Wainwright.

In 1882, Dr. William Crawford Gorgas was assigned to the hospital at Fort Brown during the height of a yellow fever outbreak. Using Fort Brown as his base of operations, Gorgas studied the disease for several years. He was sent to Cuba during the Spanish–American War.

Brownsville raid
A unit of African-American soldiers, known as Buffalo Soldiers, was stationed at Fort Brown. White residents of town resented the presence of the Black soldiers, and tensions rose. On August 13 and 14, 1906, unknown persons "raided" Brownsville, indiscriminately shooting bystanders. They wounded one White man and killed White resident Frank Natus. The townspeople of Brownsville quickly blamed the Black soldiers for the incident. The Army investigated the matter and concluded that the Black soldiers were guilty, although their supervising officers supported them and said they had been at the fort. William H. Taft, then President Theodore Roosevelt's Secretary of War and soon to be elected as president, ordered all 168 Black soldiers to be discharged "without honor".

In 1972, the Army conducted another investigation, led by Lt. Col. William Baker. The government concluded that the Black soldiers had not been responsible. They were given posthumous honorable discharges, but by then, only two of the original 168 men were still alive. The two men received compensation, but the Army did not restore the dead soldiers' pensions, to which their descendants would have been entitled.

Since the late 20th century, historians have speculated about the incident. The History Channel's program History's Mysteries attributed the incident to Brownsville residents' shooting up the town with rifles using the same caliber ammunition (.45-70 ?) as the soldiers and then framing the soldiers. (Academic press books about the Brownsville Raid include The Brownsville Raid (1970/1992) and The Senator and the Sharecropper's Son: Exoneration of the Brownsville Soldiers (1997) by John D. Weaver, and Racial Borders: Black Soldiers along the Rio Grande (2010) by James Leiker.)

First airplane to be attacked by hostile fire
On April 20, 1915, U.S. Signal Corps Officers Byron Q. Jones and Thomas Millings flew a Martin T over the fort to spot movements of Mexican Revolutionary leader Francisco "Pancho" Villa. The plane reached an altitude of 2,600 ft. and was up for 20 minutes. It did not cross the border into Mexico, although it was fired upon by machine guns and small arms. These frequent patrols lasted for 6 weeks and were used more effectively in 1916.

124th Cavalry
The troopers stationed at Fort Brown from 1929–45 were from the 124th Cavalry Regiment, Texas National Guard, which was one of the last mounted cavalry regiments in the United States Army. On November 18, 1940, they went into active military training. After the Japanese attack on Pearl Harbor, the division served with distinction, dismounted, in the China Burma India Theater, where a member of the unit from Fort Brown earned the theater's only Medal of Honor (awarded to Jack L. Knight, commanding F Troop).

United States Army Air Forces use
During World War II, Fort Brown was transferred to the USAAF Training Command on July 7, 1943.  The USAAF Gulf Coast Training Center (later Central Flying Training Command) used the fort for flexible gunnery training until the fort was inactivated on February 1, 1946.

Decommission
On February 1, 1946, Fort Brown was decommissioned and turned over to the Army Corps of Engineers on April 25, 1946.  It was acquired by the City of Brownsville and Texas Southmost College in 1948.

Three areas that were once part of the post were designated a discontiguous National Historic Landmark District in 1960, in recognition of its historic importance.  These include earthworks built in 1846, a cavalry barracks built in 1848, and a collection of buildings erected mainly between 1868 and 1870, including a hospital, morgue, barracks, commissary, colonel's house, and officers' quarters.

The Consolidated Appropriations Act, 2023 authorized the addition of Fort Brown (166 acres) to Palo Alto Battlefield National Historical Park.

Gallery

See also

 List of National Historic Landmarks in Texas
 National Register of Historic Places listings in Cameron County, Texas
 Recorded Texas Historic Landmarks in Cameron County

References
 Fort Brown, Handbook of Texas Online

External links

Closed installations of the United States Army
National Historic Landmarks in Texas
Texas in the American Civil War
Brown
Brown
Brown
Buildings and structures in Cameron County, Texas
1846 establishments in Texas
Brown
National Register of Historic Places in Cameron County, Texas
American Civil War on the National Register of Historic Places